Chakib Benmoussa (born 1958, Fes) is a Moroccan diplomat and politician. He previously served as the interior minister of Morocco and has been the lead negotiator for the Moroccan side in the Western Sahara conflict. Since December 2012, he is serving as the Moroccan ambassador to France. On October 7,2021 he was appointed as the education and sports minister.

Education
Benmoussa was born in Fes. He graduated from École Polytechnique of Paris, one of the most selective engineering schools in France, in 1979 and from École Nationale des Ponts et Chaussées in Paris in 1981 and a holder of Master of Science from Massachusetts Institute of Technology (MIT).

Career
Between 1989 and 1995 he worked as an executive at the Ministry of Equipment and Transportation, then as the secretary general of the prime minister (1995–98) and president of SONASID (1998-2000), a state-owned steel company based in Nador. In 2000, he became a member of the executive board of ONA Group, where Morocco's royal family is one of the main shareholders, and CEO of Brasseries du Maroc. He joined the Ministry of the Interior in 2002.

Interior Minister and crackdown on terrorism
The Moroccan Interior Ministry arrested 56 suspected terrorists in six cities on August 7, 2006. The suspects, believed to be members of the Jammaat Ansar El Mehdi terrorist organization, include soldiers, and wives of two pilots for Royal Air Maroc, the Moroccan state airline. Explosives, laboratory materials and propaganda leaflets were seized by police. In 2003 suicide bombings killed 45 people in Casablanca. Human rights activists accuse the Moroccan government of detaining innocent people and using torture. Commenting on the arrests on September 1, Minister Benmoussa said in a statement, "The members of this group were planning terrorist attacks targeting tourist sites, strategic government facilities and foreign holdings, and assassinations of prominent figures for political or moral reasons."

Mohammed Darif, a University of Mohammedia professor who studies Islamic terrorism, said the women's role was probably financing the terror cell.

He was, in a January 2010 cabinet reshuffle, succeeded as Interior Minister by Taib Cherkaoui.

Other roles 
In December 2019, he was appointed by the King of Morocco as the President of the Commission in charge of elaborating the New Model of Development of Morocco.

References

1958 births
People from Fez, Morocco
Massachusetts Institute of Technology alumni
Living people
Government ministers of Morocco
Moroccan chief executives
Ambassadors of Morocco
Ambassadors of Morocco to France